Tarija is a department in Bolivia. It is located in south-eastern Bolivia bordering with Argentina to the south and Paraguay to the east. According to the 2012 census, it has a population of 482,196 inhabitants. The city of Tarija is the capital of the department.

Subdivisions

The department is divided into five provinces and one autonomous region:

 Gran Chaco Province (autonomous region)
 Aniceto Arce Province
 José María Avilés Province
 Cercado Province
 Eustaquio Méndez Province
 Burdett O'Connor Province

Notable places in Tarija include:
 Villamontes in the department's oil-producing eastern scrubland. Villamontes has recorded the hottest temperature ever in Bolivia, several times, most recently on 29 October 2010.
 Bermejo, a border town adjoining Aguas Blancas, Argentina
 Yacuiba, a border town with Argentina.

The Department of Tarija is renowned for its mild, pleasant climate, and comprises one of the country's foremost agricultural regions. Its citizens have traditionally felt close to, and conducted a lively international trade with, neighboring towns of northern Argentina.  Between 1816 and 1898, the region was part of Argentina, and was ceded to Bolivia in exchange for Puna de Atacama.

Tarija boasts South America's second-largest natural gas reserves.  Increased gas revenues and foreign direct investment in gas exploration and distribution are fueling growth and turning Tarija into Bolivia's next industrial hub.  Political instability at the national level has hindered development of the reserves, as the region has chosen to align with pro-autonomy forces which aim at the devolution of considerable powers away from the central government in favor of the departments.

More than 20 different indigenous tribes, ranging in population from 20 persons up to 1500, live in the region. The Guaraní is the largest tribe. 

Important battles and events related to the 1932-35 Chaco War with Paraguay took place in the department's eastern dry lands.  Tarija was the home of Víctor Paz Estenssoro, leader of the 1952 Bolivian Revolution and four-time Constitutional President.

Economy
The main economic activity is the wine industry. The land and climate are ideal for grape and wine production. The city of Tarija holds an annual Festival of Wine and Cheese.

The petroleum industry is important not only for the region but also for the country as a whole, especially the gas industry which is exported to Argentina and Brazil. The autonomous region of Gran Chaco is from where most of the gas is exploited.

Demographics

Languages

The languages spoken in the department are mainly Spanish and Guaraní, And spoken by the migrants Quechua and Aymara. The following table shows the numbers belonging to the recognized groups of speakers.

Places of interest

 Aguaragüe National Park and Integrated Management Natural Area
 Cordillera de Sama Biological Reserve
 Tariquía Flora and Fauna National Reserve

References

Notes

Footnotes

External links
 "Tarija",  Travel Guide
 Weather in Tarija
 Bolivian Music and Web Varieties
 Full information of Tarija Department

 
Departments of Bolivia
States and territories established in 1576
1576 establishments in the Spanish Empire